Edava is one of the four railway stations serving the Varkala urban agglomeration in district of Trivandrum, Kerala. It is situated in Edava panchayat of Varkala Taluk. Edava is the 14th most revenue-generating railway station in Trivandrum district. In the 2018–19 fiscal year, Edava generated ₹11lakh profit from 1.94 lakh passengers.

Railway stations in Thiruvananthapuram district